Wajir East Constituency is an electoral constituency in Kenya. It is one of six constituencies in Wajir County. The constituency has 10 wards, all electing councillors to the Wajir County Council. The constituency was established for the 1966 elections.

Members of Parliament 

{| class="wikitable"
|-
!Elections
!MP 
!Party
!Notes
|-
| 1966 || Omar Abdi Abdullahi|| KANU || 
|-
| 1969 || A. S. Khalif || KANU || One-party system
|-
| 1970 || Diriye Mohamed Amin || KANU || By-election. One-party system
|-
| 1974 || Diriye Mohamed Amin || KANU || One-party system
|-
| 1979 || Mohamed Sheikh Abdi || KANU || One-party system
|-
| 1983 || Mohamed Sheikh Abdi || KANU || One-party system. 
|-
| 1988 || Diriye Mohamed Amin || KANU || One-party system. 
|-
| 1992 || Sheikh Mohamed Abdi || KANU || 
|-
| 1997 || Mohamed Abdi Mohamud || KANU ||
|-
| 2002 || Mohamed Abdi Mohamud || KANU
|-
| 2007 || Mohamed Ibrahim Elmi || ODM ||
|-
| 2013 || Abass Sheikh Mohamed || URP ||
|-
| 2017 || Rashid Kassim Amin || WDM ||
| 2022 Kenyan general election|2022] || [Adan Daud Mohamed ] || [Jubilee Party (JP]] ||

Wards

References 

Constituencies in Wajir County
Constituencies in North Eastern Province (Kenya)
1966 establishments in Kenya
Constituencies established in 1966